ARTTS International was a multi-discipline film, television, radio and stage training centre in Bubwith, East Riding of Yorkshire, England established by John Sichel in 1990.  The centre ran for 15 years until his death in 2005, during which time over 500 students trained there, most of whom have since found work in the entertainment industry.

History

After working many years in the theatre and television industry, Producer John Sichel fell out with the commissioners at the BBC due to his opinionated and strong views about quality over quantity and lack of originality in content being produced.

In order to find what he felt would be a forum for creative output, John, along with co-founder and wife Elfie Sichel, converted a disused pig farm into a professional television, film, theatre and radio training facility, with the idea that learning should be by doing, rather than reading.

"ARTTS" was an acronym for Advanced Residential Theatre & Television Skillcentre". It was designed for trainees to live and learn together in a professional environment.  In fact, one accommodation block was a suitably converted pig stables.

ARTTS opened in 1990 with 12 trainees, most of whom were interviewed before the facility had even been built.  One of these trainees, Geoffrey Bicker, went on to become ARTTS Technical Director for over 10 years, and throughout this time ARTTS stood by its proud "94% Employment Record".

Its on site training contained a 200-seat theatre, three television studios, a radio studio and full location equipment for television and 16mm and 35mm film. With an emphasis on the personal as well as the professional, trainees were pushed to learn the essentials of how to keep and maintain a job and reputation as someone continually employable whilst nurturing their creativity and remaining enthusiastic.

Despite its constant financial battles, ARTTS continued to provide skills to around 50 trainees a year from all over the world.

On 5 April 2005, John Sichel died and despite attempts to continue this legacy, spearheaded by not only Elfie but their daughters Katrina Sichel and Tanya Byron, and former graduates Derek Donohoe and Geoffrey Bicker, ARTTS closed down six months afterwards. Geoffrey and Derek went on to form AON Productions, continuing the corporate video work of ARTTS Productions.

The site has been restored to a usable state and now is the basis for GSP Studios, a small film company based in Yorkshire.

Notable trainees
Bruce Byron - Acting (United Kingdom) (1990)
Adrian Pang - Acting (Singapore) (1992)
Jon Sen - Directing (United Kingdom) (1996)
Sally El Hosaini - Directing (Egypt / United Kingdom) (2000)

Notable trainers
Arnold Peters (Radio Acting)
Edward Petherbridge (Acting)
John Sichel

References

Drama schools in the United Kingdom
Education in the East Riding of Yorkshire
Organisations based in the East Riding of Yorkshire